is a Japanese science fiction manga series written and illustrated by Masakazu Katsura. It was serialized in Weekly Shōnen Jump from 1983 to 1985, with the chapters collected into 13 tankōbon volumes by Shueisha.

Synopsis 
Wing-Man is the story of Kenta Hirono, a fan of superheroes and sentai television shows to the point where he dreams of becoming such a hero himself.  To that end, he creates a superhero of his own called "Wingman," and, much to the chagrin of his teachers, acts out his fantasies of being Wingman at school.  When Kenta meets Aoi Yume, the beautiful blue-haired princess of an alternate universe called Podreams, he gets his chance to make his fantasy come true, as Aoi carries a book called a Dream Note which can make any dream come true, and Kenta draws a picture of Wingman in the book, allowing him to become Wingman for real. Kenta, Aoi and Kenta's classmate and love interest, Miku Ogawa, team up to save Podreams from the evil dictator Rimel, who wants to use the Dream Note to take over Podreams, while Kenta deals with his conflicting feelings for both of his female compatriots.

Characters 

Kenta's Father

Kenta's Mother

Principal

Vice Principal

 (Kōzō Shioya in episode 7)

Media

Anime 
The manga was adapted into an anime television series titled  in 1984, produced by Toei Animation and airing on TV Asahi. It also had a 1984 visual novel adventure game adaptation of the same name, developed by TamTam and published by Enix for the NEC PC-8801 and other Japanese personal computers. It featured a point-and-click interface, where a cursor is used to interact with on-screen objects, similar to Planet Mephius (1983) and the NES version of Portopia Renzoku Satsujin Jiken (1985).

The anime, featuring character designs by Yoshinori Kanemori and intended by Toei Animation to be a strong shōnen title following the female-targeted Ai Shite Knight, marked the first anime adaptation of one of Katsura's works (Katsura himself would later appear as Wingman in a live-action adaptation of Video Girl Ai) and the debut role of Ryo Horikawa as Kenta. The anime's ending is different from that of the manga, the manga ending was never animated but was dramatized with the anime's voice actors on a drama LP.

Notes

References

External links 
 Wing-Man at Toei Animation
 

1983 manga
1984 anime television series debuts
Masakazu Katsura
Science fiction anime and manga
Shōnen manga
Shueisha franchises
Shueisha manga
Superheroes in anime and manga
Toei Animation television
Transforming heroes
TV Asahi original programming